= Khojian Ka Mohra =

- Town
- Location within Pakistan
- Coordinates: 33.27°N 73.16°E
- Country: Pakistan
- Province: (Islamabad Capital Territory) Islamabad C.T
- Elevation: 568 m (1,864 ft)
- Time zone: UTC+5 (PST)

Khojian Ka Mohra is a town in the Islamabad Capital Territory of Pakistan. It is located at 33° 27' 45N 73° 16' 45E with an altitude of 568 metres (1866 feet respectively).
